List of champions of the 1887 U.S. National Championships (now known as the US Open). The men's tournament was held from 22 August to 30 August on the outdoor grass courts at the Newport Casino in Newport, Rhode Island. It was the 7th U.S. National Championships and the second Grand Slam tournament of the year. In 1887 the first U.S. Women's National Singles Championship was held. The event was launched at the Philadelphia Cricket Club, PA and was played after the men's tournament had ended. 17-year-old Philadelphian Ellen Hansell became the first women's champion. The men's doubles event was played at the Orange Lawn Tennis Club in South Orange, New Jersey.

Champions

Men's singles

 Richard Sears defeated  Henry Slocum 6–1, 6–3, 6–2

Women's singles

 Ellen Hansell defeated  Laura Knight  6–1, 6–0

Men's doubles

 Richard Sears /  James Dwight defeated  Howard Taylor /  Henry Slocum 6–4, 3–6, 2–6, 6–3, 6–3

References

External links
Official US Open website

 
U.S. National Championships
U.S. National Championships (tennis) by year
U.S. National Championships (tennis)
U.S. National Championships (tennis)
U.S. National Championships (tennis)
U.S. National Championships (tennis)
U.S. National Championships (tennis)